Lesley Jayne Doig (born 13 August 1991) is a Scottish international lawn and indoor bowler.

Doig won a bronze medal in the 2015 World Junior Championship before achieving a notable success by winning the silver medal in the singles at the 2016 World Outdoor Bowls Championship in Christchurch losing out to Karen Murphy in the final. She then won the bronze medal in the pairs with Lauren Baillie.

In 2018, Doig won the World Indoor Mixed Pairs title with Jamie Chestney.

She was selected as part of the Scottish team for the 2018 Commonwealth Games on the Gold Coast in Queensland where she won a bronze medal in the Pairs with Claire Johnston.

References

Living people
Scottish female bowls players
1991 births
Indoor Bowls World Champions
Commonwealth Games bronze medallists for Scotland
Commonwealth Games medallists in lawn bowls
Bowls players at the 2018 Commonwealth Games
Medallists at the 2018 Commonwealth Games